Helena Araújo Ortiz (20 January 1934 – 2 February 2015) was a writer and an international professor of Latin American literature and women's studies. Her works of literary criticism have appeared in various Latin American and European literary journals.

Personal life
Helena was born on 20 January 1934 in Bogotá, D.C., Colombia, the second of four children to Alfonso Araújo Gaviria and Emma Ortiz Márquez. She married Pierre Albrecht de Martini with whom she had four daughters: Priscilla, Gisèle, Nicole and Jocelyne. She spent her childhood and adolescence between Colombia and Venezuela, Brazil, and the United States where her father was stationed as a diplomat; she attended her high school senior year at Immaculata High School, in Washington, D.C. (1948-1949) graduating at the age of 15.  She continued her education with studies in literature at the University of Maryland (1949-1950). Back in Colombia she pursued studies in literature and philosophy at the National University of Colombia until 1951 when she got married. In 1971 she and her daughters moved to Switzerland where shortly thereafter she became a widow and where she has remained ever since. She continued her education in literature and philosophy at the University of Geneva and the University of Lausanne.

Career
She has published numerous literary criticism articles, several fiction books, multiple short stories and essays. She has been translated from Spanish into English, French, Italian and German. She has taught Latin American culture and literature at the Popular University of Lausanne, Switzerland (1994-2002) and has presented numerous seminars and courses internationally about Latin American women writers.

Recognition
She is the recipient of literary prizes including the 1984 Platero Award by the Spanish Book Club of the United Nations in Geneva for her essay Post-nadaístas colombianas. In 2005 Lausanne District and the Embassy of Colombia in Switzerland gave tribute to Araújo for her work in literature. In 2009 Araújo was honoured during the VI Gathering of Colombian Women Writers; El Tiempo published a short memoir that was presented during the tribute.

Selected works
Books

 
 

Chapters

Journal articles

References

External links

1934 births
2015 deaths
People from Bogotá
Colombian emigrants to Switzerland
National University of Colombia alumni
University of Maryland, College Park alumni
University of Geneva alumni
University of Lausanne alumni
Literary critics of Spanish
Colombian literary critics
Women literary critics
Colombian women short story writers
Colombian short story writers
Feminist studies scholars
Feminist writers
Colombian essayists
Colombian women essayists
Colombian women novelists
20th-century short story writers
20th-century essayists
20th-century Colombian novelists
20th-century Colombian women writers
21st-century Colombian women writers
21st-century Colombian novelists
Colombian women anthropologists
Colombian expatriates in the United States